The Scowcroft Warehouse is a historic building in Ogden, Utah. It was built as a four-storey warehouse with a basement in 1900 for John Scowcroft and Sons, whose founder John Scowcroft converted to the Church of Jesus Christ of Latter-day Saints in England before immigrating to Utah with his family in 1880. He was the founder and namesake of this dry goods wholesale company in Ogden, and he was also a director of a beetroot sugar manufacturer in Northern Utah called the Ogden Sugar Company, which later merged with several companies to become the Amalgamated Sugar Company. The factory was designed by Ogden architect Leslie S. Hodgson and was listed on the National Register of Historic Places in 1978.

Scowcroft's son Heber was the president of John Scrowcroft and Sons, and he resided at the Heber Scowcroft House, also listed on the NRHP.

References

National Register of Historic Places in Weber County, Utah
Commercial buildings completed in 1900
1900 establishments in Utah